Marilyn J. Suiter is a geologist whose professional career has spanned teaching, working the oil and gas industry and public services.  In her leadership roles at both the American Geosciences Institute and the National Science Foundation, Suiter has worked over decades to increase the ethnic diversity of the geosciences.

Background 
Suiter started her undergraduate studies at Franklin & Marshall College as a Physics major and switched to geosciences because she found the interdisciplinary nature of geology more challenging and satisfying. After earning her BS degree, Suiter taught sciences for grades 5–12 in the Philadelphia public school system (1970-1977). She worked for the United States Geological Survey for four years before starting her MS studies at Wesleyan University.  After earning her MS in earth science in 1981, Suiter worked in the oil and gas industry for Cities Service Oil and Gas in the early 1980s.

During the oil price crash of the mid 1980s, Suiter decided to leave the oil and gas industry. From 1987 to 1997, Suiter held several positions within the American Geosciences Institute, including director of Special Education Programs, director of Education and Human Resources, and director of Human Resources and Career Development. At the American Geosciences Institute, Suiter also led the Minority Participation Program, which was created to address the lack of ethnic diversity in the geosciences and which awards scholarships to under-represented American geoscience students every year.

Since Suiter started working for the National Science Foundation in 1998, she has led several programs within NSF that foster geosciences education and diversity. Suiter currently serves as a program director in NSF's Division of Human Resource Development.

Service to the Discipline of Geosciences 
Over her career, Suiter has served on numerous committees and panels of the Association for Women Geoscientists, the American Geosciences Institute, the American Association for the Advancement of Science, the American Geophysical Union, the National Science Foundation, the American Institute of Physics, the Association for Women in Science, the National Science Teaching Association, the National Association of Black Geologists and Geophysicists, and the American Educational Research Association.

Suiter's conference presentations and peer-reviewed papers address issues of geosciences education as well as diversity and inclusion within the geosciences. These include:

Honors 

 2018 Geological Society of America Distinguished Service Award
 2018 American Geosciences Institute Explorer Award
 2010  Geological Society of America Bromery Award
 2007 Fellow of the American Association for the Advancement of Science
 1994 Association of Women Geoscientists Distinguished Service Award
 1988 President of the Association for Women Geoscientists
 Fellow of the Geological Society of America
 Fellow of the Association for Women in Science

References 

African-American women scientists
20th-century American geologists
American women scientists
Living people
Year of birth missing (living people)
Fellows of the American Association for the Advancement of Science
20th-century African-American women
20th-century African-American scientists
21st-century African-American people
21st-century African-American women
20th-century American women scientists